Artlist is an Israel-based creative technology company that specializes in royalty-free digital content, and is the owner of several video and image editing platforms.

History 
Artlist was founded in Israel in 2016 by Ira Belsky, Itzik Elbaz, Eyal Raz and Assaf Ayalon as a royalty-free music site called Artlist.io that originally targeted independent filmmakers looking to license music cheaply.

The company expanded its catalog with the launch of the Artgrid stock footage platform in 2019 and a sound effects subscription service.

Elephant Partners made an initial investment in 2018 before Artlist raised $48M led by the investment company KKR in February 2020. In December 2020 the company acquired the Atlanta-based company Motion Array for $65M. After the Motion Array acquisition, Artlist reportedly had a library of over 800,000 digital assets.

In May 2021, Artlist joined the independent music publisher's agency IMPEL. Artlist has announced a collaboration with Israel's ACUM, as well as its European and American counterparts IMPEL and BMI, The MLC, and ASCAP, to collect royalties for the use of its original content produced by the company’s in-house label, Artlist Original. Artlist Original produces over a 1,000 original songs per year for licensing on the Artlist platforms.

In 2021, Artlist announced the acquisition of FXhome, a Norwich-based software company that specializes in software and plugins for video and image editing, to become its software division.

Products

Motion Array 
Motion Array was founded in 2013 as an all in one subscription platform for digital media assets such as templates, presets, add-ons, transitions and motion graphics. The company was acquired by Artlist for $65M in December 2020.  The acquisition helped the company reach a combined subscriber base of over six million.

Artgrid 
Artgrid, a platform for licensing stock footage where subscribers are allowed unlimited downloads of stock video assets.  Depending on your plan, the clips are available in various resolutions from HD H.264 all the way up to 4K RAW/LOG footage.

FXhome 
FXHome was founded in 2001 as an effort to create Star Wars lightsaber effects for a home movie. The subscription service offers content creators visual effects software.  FXhome had 6.5 million subscribers when it was acquired by Artlist in 2021.

References

External links
 Official Website

Companies of Israel
Israeli companies established in 2016
Technology companies